Rock Falls is a city in Cerro Gordo County, Iowa, United States, along the Shell Rock River. The population was 150 at the time of the 2020 census. It is part of the Mason City Micropolitan Statistical Area.

Geography
Rock Falls is located at  (43.206223, -93.086145).

Demographics

2010 census
As of the census of 2010, there were 155 people, 68 households, and 50 families residing in the city. The racial makeup of the city was 98.7% White, 0.6% Asian, and 0.6% from two or more races.

There were 68 households, of which 22.1% had children under the age of 18 living with them, 66.2% were married couples living together, 4.4% had a female householder with no husband present, 2.9% had a male householder with no wife present, and 26.5% were non-families. 19.1% of all households were made up of individuals, and 10.3% had someone living alone who was 65 years of age or older. The average household size was 2.28 and the average family size was 2.64.

The median age in the city was 49.5 years. 14.8% of residents were under the age of 18; 4.7% were between the ages of 18 and 24; 24.5% were from 25 to 44; 29.1% were from 45 to 64; and 27.1% were 65 years of age or older. The gender makeup of the city was 51.0% male and 49.0% female.

2000 census
As of the census of 2000, there were 170 people, 68 households, and 55 families residing in the city. The racial makeup of the city was 100.00% White. Hispanic or Latino of any race were 0.59% of the population.

There were 68 households, out of which 32.4% had children under the age of 18 living with them, 69.1% were married couples living together, 5.9% had a female householder with no husband present, and 19.1% were non-families. 17.6% of all households were made up of individuals, and 8.8% had someone living alone who was 65 years of age or older. The average household size was 2.50 and the average family size was 2.76.

In the city, the population was spread out, with 22.4% under the age of 18, 5.9% from 18 to 24, 29.4% from 25 to 44, 25.9% from 45 to 64, and 16.5% who were 65 years of age or older. The median age was 42 years. For every 100 females, there were 102.4 males. For every 100 females age 18 and over, there were 94.1 males.

The median income for a household in the city was $40,714, and the median income for a family was $42,917. Males had a median income of $28,750 versus $16,719 for females. The per capita income for the city was $17,523. None of the families and 1.1% of the population were living below the poverty line, including no under eighteens and 4.4% of those over 64.

Education
Rock Falls' public schools are operated by the Central Springs Community School District, established on July 1, 2011, by the merger of North Central Community School District and Nora Springs–Rock Falls Community School District.

References

Cities in Cerro Gordo County, Iowa
Cities in Iowa
Mason City, Iowa micropolitan area